Jana Novotná and Jim Pugh were the defending champions but lost in the second round to Zina Garrison and Sherwood Stewart.

Robin White and Shelby Cannon won in the final 3–6, 6–2, 7–5 against Meredith McGrath and Rick Leach.

Seeds
Champion seeds are indicated in bold text while text in italics indicates the round in which those seeds were eliminated.

Draw

Final

Top half

Bottom half

References
1989 US Open – Doubles draws and results at the International Tennis Federation

Mixed Doubles
US Open (tennis) by year – Mixed doubles